Le Populaire is a major independent daily newspaper in Senegal.

References

Newspapers published in Senegal
Publications with year of establishment missing